Worthington is a borough in Armstrong County, Pennsylvania, United States. The population was 639 at the 2010 census.

History
Worthington was laid out on a tract of land called Mt. Lorenzo by Judge James Barr in 1843–1844. He chose the location due to the nearby junction of two important early stage coach routes, the east–west route from Indiana, Pennsylvania, to Butler, and the north–south route from Freeport to Emlenton. It was incorporated as a borough in 1855. As the village grew into a town it variously relied upon farming and light manufacturing for its income. During the 1970s most manufacturing ceased. Agriculture is still important to the region, and a few light tool and die firms survive. The region also features coal, natural gas, and mineral extraction. In the 19th century an iron furnace and woolen mill were the main industrial operations, both owned and operated by Peter Graff I.

The town's first settlers were a mix of eastern Pennsylvanians and newly arrived immigrants of Scotch-Irish, German and English background. Other ethnic groups would arrive in the early 20th century in small numbers. Other later industries included tile block and clay drain pipe manufacturing, aluminum ladder and specialty tool and die production, limestone mining, and underground mushroom farming. The town hosts several merchants including the Worthington Hardware, Grumpy's Pizza (formerly Cade's Tomato Pie, Cooper's Pizza), Carlesi's Restaurant, Moonlight Credit Union, Wo-Town Market (formerly Long's Market) and Bowser's Feed Store, four Protestant churches, a community park, several civic organizations (including a public library), and a community center and municipal complex housed in the former Junior/Senior High School. The fire hall serves both Worthington borough and West Franklin Township. 

The joint municipalities of Worthington borough and West Franklin Township (which includes the former villages of Craigsville, Yellowdog, and Laird's Crossing) have cooperated in many areas including public utilities (water and sewage), and both municipalities are often colloquially referred to as Worthington - sharing the same zip code of 16262. The former high school is actually located outside of Worthington borough and was officially called Worthington-West Franklin Jr./Sr. High School. The mascot for the school was the Bison, and the school colors were green and white. The school closed around 1984, and the students began attending Kittanning High School, which also closed in 2015 (along with Ford City and Elderton high schools) in order to form Armstrong High School.

Worthington P.O. appears in the 1876 Atlas of Armstrong County, Pennsylvania.

Geography
U.S. Route 422, the four-lane Benjamin Franklin Highway, passes through the borough south of its center, leading east  to Kittanning and west  to Butler. The borough extends west into the valley of Buffalo Creek, a tributary of the Allegheny River.

Demographics

As of the census of 2000, there were 778 people, 307 households, and 212 families residing in the borough. The population density was 1,380.4 people per square mile (536.4/km2). There were 319 housing units at an average density of 566.0 per square mile (219.9/km2). The racial makeup of the borough was 99.10% White, 0.26% African American, 0.13% Asian, 0.13% from other races, and 0.39% from two or more races. Hispanic or Latino of any race were 0.26% of the population.

There were 307 households, out of which 29.3% had children under the age of 18 living with them, 56.7% were married couples living together, 9.4% had a female householder with no husband present, and 30.9% were non-families. 26.4% of all households were made up of individuals, and 12.1% had someone living alone who was 65 years of age or older. The average household size was 2.43 and the average family size was 2.91.

The borough median age of 40 years was the same as the county median age. The distribution by age group was 22.2% under the age of 18, 7.8% from 18 to 24, 26.6% from 25 to 44, 26.9% from 45 to 64, and 16.5% who were 65 years of age or older. The median age was 40 years. For every 100 females there were 90.7 males. For every 100 females age 18 and over, there were 92.7 males.

The median income for a household in the borough was $31,000, and the median income for a family was $37,292. Males had a median income of $27,443 versus $21,818 for females. The per capita income for the borough was $15,122. About 2.9% of families and 9.2% of the population were below the poverty line, including 7.0% of those under age 18 and 7.8% of those age 65 or over.

References

Populated places established in 1811
Boroughs in Armstrong County, Pennsylvania